Seo Hui-suk (born 21 November 1947) is a South Korean volleyball player. She competed in the women's tournament at the 1968 Summer Olympics.

References

1947 births
Living people
South Korean women's volleyball players
Olympic volleyball players of South Korea
Volleyball players at the 1968 Summer Olympics
Sportspeople from Busan
Asian Games medalists in volleyball
Volleyball players at the 1966 Asian Games
Medalists at the 1966 Asian Games
Asian Games silver medalists for South Korea